In Greek mythology, Campe  or Kampe was a female monster. She was the guard, in Tartarus, of the Cyclopes and Hecatoncheires, whom Uranus had imprisoned there. When it was prophesied to Zeus that he would be victorious in the Titanomachy—the great war against the Titans—with the help of Campe's prisoners, he killed Campe, freeing the Cyclopes and Hecatoncheires, who then helped Zeus defeat Cronus.

Name
The name given in Greek texts is Κάμπη, with an accent on the first syllable. As a common noun κάμπη is the Greek word for caterpillar or silkworm. It is probably related to the homophone καμπή (with the accent on the second syllable) whose first meaning is the winding of a river, and came to mean, more generally, any kind of bend, or curve.

Sources
We first hear of the imprisonment of the Cyclopes and Hecatoncheires, and their subsequent release by Zeus, in Hesiod's Theogony. However Hesiod makes no mention of Campe, or any guard for the prisoners. These events were probably also told in the lost epic poem the Titanomachy, upon which the mythographer Apollodorus perhaps based his account of the war. According to Apollodorus:

Diodorus Siculus says that the god Dionysus, while camped beside the Libyan city of Zabirna, encountered and killed "an earth-born monster called Campê" that was terrorizing the city, killing many of its residents.
Neither Apollodorus nor Diodorus provide any description of Campe; however, the Greek poet Nonnus provides an elaborately detailed one. According to Nonnus, Zeus, with his thunderbolt, destroyed:

Thus for Nonnus, Campe is woman-like from the upper torso and above, with the scales of a sea-monster from the chest down, with several snaky appendages, along with the parts of several other animals protruding from her body. His description of Campe is similar to Hesiod's description of the monster Typhon (Theogony 820 ff.). Joseph Eddy Fontenrose says that for Nonnus, Campe "was a female counterpart of his Typhon ... That is, she was Echidna under a different name, as Nonnus indicates, calling her Echidnaean Enyo, identifying her snaky legs with echidnas, and likening her to Sphinx and Skylla".

Notes

References
 Apollodorus, Apollodorus, The Library, with an English Translation by Sir James George Frazer, F.B.A., F.R.S. in 2 Volumes. Cambridge, Massachusetts, Harvard University Press; London, William Heinemann Ltd. 1921. Online version at the Perseus Digital Library.
 Butler, George F., "Spenser, Milton, and the Renaissance Campe: Monsters and Myths in The Faerie Queene and Paradise Lost, in Milton Studies 40, Albert C. Labriola (Editor), University of Pittsburgh Press; 1st edition (December 13, 2001). . pp. 19–37.
 Diodorus Siculus, Diodorus Siculus: The Library of History. Translated by C. H. Oldfather. Twelve volumes. Loeb Classical Library. Cambridge, Massachusetts: Harvard University Press; London: William Heinemann, Ltd. 1989. Online version by Bill Thayer
 Fontenrose, Joseph Eddy, Python: A Study of Delphic Myth and Its Origins, University of California Press, 1959. .
 Gantz, Timothy, Early Greek Myth: A Guide to Literary and Artistic Sources, Johns Hopkins University Press, 1996, Two volumes:  (Vol. 1),  (Vol. 2).
 Grimal, Pierre, The Dictionary of Classical Mythology, Wiley-Blackwell, 1996. .
 Hard, Robin, The Routledge Handbook of Greek Mythology: Based on H.J. Rose's "Handbook of Greek Mythology", Psychology Press, 2004, .
 Hesiod, Theogony, in The Homeric Hymns and Homerica with an English Translation by Hugh G. Evelyn-White, Cambridge, Massachusetts, Harvard University Press; London, William Heinemann Ltd. 1914. Online version at the Perseus Digital Library.
 Nonnus, Dionysiaca; translated by Rouse, W H D, II Books XVI–XXXV. Loeb Classical Library No. 345, Cambridge, Massachusetts, Harvard University Press; London, William Heinemann Ltd. 1940. Internet Archive.
 Ogden, Daniel, Drakōn: Dragon Myth and Serpent Cult in the Greek and Roman Worlds, Oxford University Press, 2013. .
 Smith, William; Dictionary of Greek and Roman Biography and Mythology, London (1873). Online version at the Perseus Digital Library
 West, M. L. (2002), "'Eumelos': A Corinthian Epic Cycle?" in The Journal of Hellenic Studies, vol. 122, pp. 109–133. .
 West, M. L. (2003), Greek Epic Fragments: From the Seventh to the Fifth Centuries BC. Edited and translated by Martin L. West. Loeb Classical Library No. 497. Cambridge, Massachusetts: Harvard University Press, 2003.  . Online version at Harvard University Press.

Greek dragons
Greek legendary creatures
Mythological hybrids
Female legendary creatures